Yang Yang (born 19 May 1986 in Beijing, China) is a Chinese baseball player who was a member of Team China at the 2008 Summer Olympics.

Sports career
1994 Beijing Fengtai Baseball and Softball School;
2002 Beijing Municipal Team;
2004 National Junior Team;
2008 National Team for Intensified Training

Major performances
2002 Beijing Municipal Games - 1st;
2003 National Intercity Games - 1st;
2005/2006 National Junior League - 2nd/1st;
2006/2007 National Championship - 1st/2nd;

References
Profile 2008 Olympics Team China

1986 births
Living people
Baseball players at the 2008 Summer Olympics
Beijing Tigers players
Chinese baseball players
Olympic baseball players of China
2009 World Baseball Classic players
Baseball players from Beijing
Baseball players at the 2010 Asian Games
Asian Games competitors for China